Hebeloma pusillum is a species of mushroom in the family Hymenogastraceae. It is found in Europe.

References

pusillum
Fungi described in 1938
Fungi of Europe